Inese is a feminine Latvian feminine given name and may refer to: 
Inese Jaunzeme (1932 – 2011), Latvian athlete
Inese Galante (born 1954), Latvian soprano opera singer
Inese Laizāne (born 1971), Latvian politician
Inese Lībiņa-Egnere (born 1977), Latvian politician 
Inese Šlesere (born 1972), Latvian former model and politician
Inese Vaidere (born 1952), Latvian politician

References

Latvian feminine given names
Feminine given names